Gandab-e Sofla or Gandab Sofla may refer to:
 Gandab-e Sofla, Kermanshah
 Gandab-e Sofla, Kurdistan